The 2008 United States Men's Curling Championship was held from February 16 to 23 at the Hibbing Curling Club in Hibbing, Minnesota. It was held in conjunction with the 2008 United States Women's Curling Championship. Craig Brown skipped his team to victory, his second national title. Craig Disher was runner-up for the third year in a row. As national champions, Team Brown earned the opportunity to represent the United States at the 2008 World Men's Curling Championship in Grand Forks, North Dakota, where they finished in 7th place.

Teams
Ten men's teams competed in the 2008 Championship:

Round-robin standings 
Final round-robin standings.

Round-robin results 
All draw times are listed in Central Standard Time (UTC−6).

Draw 1 
Saturday, February 16, 6:00pm

Draw 2 
Saturday, February 16, 6:00pm

Draw 3 
Sunday, February 17, 2:00pm

Draw 4 
Monday, February 18, 12:00pm

Draw 5 
Monday, February 18, 8:00pm

Draw 6 
Tuesday, February 19, 2:00pm

Draw 7 
Wednesday, February 20, 8:00am

Draw 8 
Wednesday, February 20, 4:00pm

Draw 9 
Thursday, February 21, 8:00am

Tiebreaker

Playoffs

1 vs. 2 
Friday, February 22, 12:00pm

3 vs. 4 
Friday, February 22, 12:00pm

Semifinal 
Friday, February 22, 7:00pm

Final  
Saturday, February 23, 3:00pm

References 

United States National Curling Championships
Curling in Minnesota
2008 in curling
February 2008 sports events in the United States
2008 in sports in Minnesota
Hibbing, Minnesota
Events in St. Louis County, Minnesota